The LG Optimus Vu II (Also known as LG Vu 2 in South Korea) is an Android smartphone/tablet computer hybrid ("phablet"), released in September 2012 and noted for its 5.0-inch screen size—between that of conventional smartphones, and larger tablets. It is powered by a 1.5 GHz dual-core Krait CPU with Adreno 225 GPU and runs on Android 4.0.4 Ice Cream Sandwich which is upgradable to Android 4.4.2 KitKat

See also
 LG Optimus
 LG Vu series
 List of LG mobile phones
 Comparison of smartphones

References
 LG Optimus Vu II Specifications GSMArena

Android (operating system) devices
LG Electronics smartphones
Mobile phones introduced in 2012
Discontinued smartphones
Mobile phones with infrared transmitter